William Bader Leckonby (September 16, 1917 – October 22, 2007) was an American football player, coach of football and golf, and college athletics administrator. He played college football at St. Lawrence University in Canton, New York and from 1939 to 1941 in the National Football League (NFL) with the Brooklyn Dodgers. Leckonby served as the head football coach at Lehigh University from 1946 to 1961, compiling a record of 85–53–5. His 85 wins are the most of any coach in the history of the Lehigh Mountain Hawks football program, and his tenure of 16 seasons as head coach is the longest in team history. Lecknoby was also the head golf coach at Lehigh, tallying a mark of 161–62, and he served as the school's athletic director from 1962 to 1984.

Head coaching record

Football

References

External links
 

1917 births
2007 deaths
Brooklyn Dodgers (NFL) players
Lehigh Mountain Hawks athletic directors
Lehigh Mountain Hawks football coaches
St. Lawrence Saints football players
United States Navy personnel of World War II
United States Navy officers
People from Greenville, Ohio
Sportspeople from Troy, New York
Players of American football from New York (state)
Coaches of American football from New York (state)